Archangelgorod Governorate (Arkhangelogorodskaya guberniya), or the Government of Archangelgorod, was an administrative division (a guberniya) of the Tsardom of Russia and then the Russian Empire, which existed from 1708 until 1780. Its seat was in Archangel (modern Arkhangelsk). The governorate was located in the north of the Russian Empire and bordered Siberia Governorate in the east, Kazan Governorate in the southeast, Moscow and Ingermanland Governorates in the southwest, Sweden (later independent Finland) in the west, and Norway in north-west. In the north, the governorate was limited by the White and Barents Seas.

As with the rest of the governorates, neither the borders nor internal subdivisions of Archangelgorod Governorate were defined; instead, the territory was defined as a set of cities and the lands adjacent to those cities.

In terms of the modern political division of Russia, Archangelgorod Governorate comprised the areas of what is currently Murmansk Oblast, Nenets Autonomous Okrug and the Komi Republic, the greater parts of Arkhangelsk and Vologda Oblasts, as well as parts of the Republic of Karelia, Kostroma, Kirov, and Nizhny Novgorod Oblasts.

On , 1719, the governorate was divided into provinces: Archangelgorod, Vologda, Galich, and Ustyug. Simultaneously, Yarensky Uyezd with the administrative center of Yarensk was moved from Siberia Governorate to Archangelgorod Governorate. The uyezds were transformed into districts, however, in 1727 the districts were transformed back into uyezds.

The governorate existed until  1780, when it was transformed into Vologda Viceroyalty.

Governors
The administration of the governorate was performed by a governor. The governors of the Arkhangelogorod Governorate were
 1708-1711 Pyotr Alexeevich Golitsyn
 1711-1714 Alexey Alexandrovich Kurbatov (vice-governor)
 1714-1725 Pyotr Yefimovich Lodyzhensky
 1725-1727 Ivan Petrovich Izmaylov
 1727-1728 Ivan Mikhaylovich Likharev
 1728-1729 Villim Fermor
 1729-1732 Semyon Fyodorovich Meshchersky
 1732-1732 Ivan Maksimovich Shuvalov
 1732-1738 Mikhail Yuryevich Shcherbatov (the father of Mikhail Shcherbatov)
 1738-1740 Andrey Litskin
 1740-1740 Pyotr Kalinovich Pushkin
 1740-1743 Alexey Andreyevich Obolensky-Bely
 1743-1745 Alexey Mikhaylovich Pushkin
 1745-1762 Stepan Alexeyevich Yuryev
 1762-1763 Grigory Filatovich Sukhotin
 1763-1780 Yegor Andreyevich Golovtsyn

References

Governorates of the Russian Empire
States and territories established in 1708
1708 establishments in Russia
1780 disestablishments in the Russian Empire
History of Murmansk Oblast
History of Arkhangelsk Oblast
History of the Komi Republic